Stephen Robson is a British artist and printmaker.

Life and career
Stephen Robson was born in Cambridgeshire, England on 19 June 1956, where he lived until he went to study fine art at Goldsmiths College.
After a successful career in photography, Stephen returned to drawing and printmaking, and studied printmaking. He is best known for his abstract depictions of English landscapes.

References

1956 births
Living people
Alumni of Goldsmiths, University of London